Mark Nemenman (6 November 1936, Minsk, Belarus - 20 September 2022, San Mateo, California) was a Soviet computer scientist, notable as a pioneer in systems programming and programming language research. He was one of the main developers of the AKI language (in Russian АКИ - АвтоКод ИНЖЕНЕР - Engineer's Autocode) in 1964, before BASIC became known. He led the development of system software for Minsk-32, the most popular of Minsk family of computers.

He was awarded Lenin Komsomol Prize in 1970, received his Ph.D. in 1975 (scientific advisor - Andrey Ershov), Professor since 1984.

Nemenman authored more than 70 papers and 5 books. He is the father of two sons, one of whom is theoretical physicist Ilya Nemenman.

Books 
 Nemenman, Tsagelsky, Matyushevskaya Autocode for engineering problems solving on Minsk 2 Minsk, 1965 
 Nemenman Programming in AKI Minsk, 1972
 Kushnerev, Nemenman, Tsagelsky Programming for Computer Minsk-32 Moscow, 1973
 Belokurskaya, Kushnerev, Nemenman Minsk 32 Dispatcher Moscow, 1973 
 Lopato, Nemenman, Pykhtin, Tikmenov Personal-professional Computers Moscow, 1988
 Belokurskaya, Emelyanchik, Nemenman Personal Computers ES. Abacus Package Moscow, 19

External links 
Biography (in Russian)
Documents from Andrey Ershov Archive
Minsk family of computers
Nemenman, Mark oral history (transcript) / (video recording) by Computer History Museum

1936 births
20th-century Belarusian Jews
21st-century Belarusian Jews
Living people
Scientists from Minsk
Belarusian Jews
Belarusian computer scientists
Computer programmers
American people of Belarusian-Jewish descent
Soviet computer scientists